Scarborough Cricket Club plays in the Western Australian Grade Cricket competition, the Retravision Shield. Nicknamed the Gulls, its home ground is Abbett Park. The club was founded in 1946.

One of Western Australia's most successful cricket clubs in recent history, Scarborough won the 1st Grade competition in 2006–07, 2007–08, 2008–09 and 2009–10, the first team to win four straight titles since 1919.

Scarborough's head coach since 2006 is former Gulls paceman Simon Bowman, while batsman Clint Heron captained the 2008–09 and 2009–10 grand final wins.

The club has produced several players who have represented Australia in Test cricket, most notably Justin Langer.

Its most recent State representatives include Theo Doropoulos, Michael Johnson, Marcus Stoinis and Justin Coetzee, while Scarborough players presently in the WA squad are Johnson and Marcus Harris.

References

Sporting clubs in Perth, Western Australia
Western Australian Grade Cricket clubs
Cricket clubs established in 1947
1947 establishments in Australia